Lars Sørensen, Sorensen or Sorenson may refer to:

 Lars Sørensen (editor) (1905–1987), Norwegian newspaper editor and politician
 Lars Sørensen (swimmer) (born 1968), Danish Olympic swimmer
Lars Sørensen (footballer) from 1984–85 European Cup
Lars Sorensen (athlete) from World University Cross Country Championships
Lars Sorenson, character in The Warlord: Battle for the Galaxy